Panaspis massaiensis, also known as the Maasai snake-eyed skink, is a species of lidless skinks in the family Scincidae. It is found in Kenya and Tanzania. Until its revalidation in 2019, it was considered of synonym of Panaspis wahlbergi.

Panaspis massaiensis is a small skink measuring on average  in snout–vent length.

References

Panaspis
Skinks of Africa
Reptiles of Kenya
Reptiles of Tanzania
Reptiles described in 1924
Taxa named by Fernand Angel